News Corp is a company spun off from the original News Corporation.

News Corp may also refer to:
 News Corporation, an American multinational mass media corporation operated and owned by Rupert Murdoch in 1980-2013
 News Corp Australia

See also 
 Fox Corporation (2019–present), the legal successor to the 21st Century Fox
 List of assets owned by News Corp
 List of assets owned by 21st Century Fox
 News UK, the British subsidiary of News Corp
 21st Century Fox (2013–2019), the legal successor to the original News Corporation